The Nasal Provocation Test (NPT or nasal challenge test) is a medical procedure indicated for help the diagnosis of allergic rhinitis and nonallergic rhinitis. NPT may be monitored by clinical scores, rhinomanometry, acoustic rhinometry, nasal smear cytology and/or spirometry.

References

Allergology
Immunologic tests